Logi Már Einarsson (born 21 August 1964, in Akureyri) is an Icelandic politician and architect.

Early life and education 
Logi grew up in Akureyri and took stúdentspróf from Menntaskólinn á Akureyri in 1985. He studied architecture at the Oslo School of Architecture and Design 1986– 92 and graduated as a civil architect (Master of Architecture).

Professional life 
Following graduation Logi returned to Akureyri, where he worked as a landscape designer at H.J. teiknistofa 1992–94 and for the technical and zoning office at Akureyri municipality 1994–96, before switching back to the private sector where he worked for Form 1996-97, Úti og Inni 1997– 2003 and Arkitektúr.is 2003–04. In late 2003 he founded the architecture and design firm Kollgáta together with industrial designer Ingólfur Freyr Guðmundsson. From 2010–12 he also lectured at Reykjavik University. Logi has been chairman of the Icelandic architectural association, Arkitektafélag Íslands.

Political career 
Logi first ran for parliament in the Northeast Constituency in the 2009 Althing election for the Social Democratic Alliance (SDA), and served as a substitute MP on five occasions during the 2009-2013 term. He became a member of the City Council in Akureyri in 2010, and was elected as deputy chairman of the SDA on their party conference in 2016.
Logi contested the Northeast Constituency for his party in the 2016 Althing election and won the party's sole constituency seat. SDA suffered the worst defeat in the history of the party in the election, and as a consequence party chairman Oddný G. Harðardóttir stepped down and Logi was selected as Party Leader by the board on October 31, 2016. He left the City Council in Akureyri shortly after being elected to the Althing. He is a vice-chairman of the Icelandic Parliament Foreign Committee and member of the Future Committee. Logi was re-elected as Party Leader at the SDA Party Congress in March 2018.

Personal life 
Logi is married to the lawyer and flute player, Arnbjörg Sigurðardóttir. They have two children, Úlfur and Hrefna.

References

External links 
 Biography of Logi Már Einarsson on the Althing website

1964 births
Living people
Logi Már Einarsson
Logi Már Einarsson
Logi Már Einarsson
Logi Már Einarsson